Marugalpatty is a village in Theni District, in the southern state of  Tamil Nadu, India. It is located western 18 km from Periyakulam  and south 15 km from Andipatti.

Villages in Theni district